Winds of the Day is a 1964 novel by the British writer Howard Spring. It was Spring's final novel.

References

Bibliography
 George Watson & Ian R. Willison. The New Cambridge Bibliography of English Literature, Volume 4. CUP, 1972.

1964 British novels
Novels by Howard Spring
Novels set in Manchester
Novels set in Cornwall
Novels set in London
William Collins, Sons books